Yuanhunine is an anti-allergic alkaloid isolated from Corydalis.

References

External links
 The combination of rat mast cell and rabbit aortic smooth muscle is the simple bioassay for the screening of anti-allergic ingredient from methanolic extract of Corydalis tuber

Phytochemicals